The Anglican Diocese of Aba is one of nine within the Anglican Province of Aba, itself one of 14 provinces within the Church of Nigeria. The current bishop is Christian Ugwuzor.

Notes

Dioceses of the Province of Aba
 
Church of Nigeria dioceses